Violet Grove is a hamlet in central Alberta, Canada within Brazeau County.

Demographics 
The population of Violet Grove according to the 2005 municipal census conducted by Brazeau County is 141.

See also 
List of communities in Alberta
List of hamlets in Alberta

References 

Brazeau County
Hamlets in Alberta